Sehban Azim is an Indian television actor, having worked in TV shows like Dill Mill Gayye, Ek Hazaaron Mein Meri Behna Hai, Humsafars, Thapki Pyar Ki, Bepannaah and Tujhse Hai Raabta.

Early life
Born in Delhi to a writer mother and painter father Abdul, Azim did studentship at Dyal Singh College (Delhi). During college days he did small jobs like promoter or coordinator.

Career 

Azim moved to Mumbai to pursue his acting career. He is a poet as well.

Media 
Azim was ranked at No. 10 in 2018, at No. 19 in 2019, at No. 14 in 2020 consecutively in the list of The Times 20 Most Desirable Men on Television.

Filmography

Films

Television

Web series

Music videos

References

External links 

Apeejay School alumni
Indian male models
21st-century Indian male actors
Indian male television actors
Male actors in Hindi television
Living people
1986 births